The National High School is one of the oldest schools in Bangalore. The school was founded in 1917 by Annie Besant. It is one of the oldest landmarks of the Basavanagudi area. The alumni of this school include Anil Kumble, Vishnuvardhan and EAS Prasanna.

High schools and secondary schools in Bangalore
1917 establishments in India
Educational institutions established in 1917